Established in 1986, the Private Schools Athletic Association (PSAA) is a sports league for independent high schools primarily located in the New York Metropolitan Area.

Mission
 Develop and foster athletic standards of excellence for boys and girls among its member schools.
 Promote and cultivate the ideas of sportsmanship, good citizenship and moral integrity by means of athletic participation and competition.
 Improve athletic opportunities by promoting uniform standards in the arrangement of interscholastic programs among member schools.
 To foster good, sound athletic programs for boys and girls as an effective part of the educational programs of our schools.
 Represent the member schools of the association with other athletic educational agencies in the determination of policies and programs affecting interscholastic athletics in secondary schools.
 To conduct tournaments and playoffs and provide a forum for discussion among its members.

P.S.A.A. History
It originally was formed in 1917 to fill a need for a secondary school sports league for the private schools in the New York metropolitan area. Prior to the 1920s, New York City had the longest history with private schools leagues, beginning with the New York Interscholastic Athletic Association formed in 1879. This league went into decline and disappeared in the first decade of the twentieth century, leaving the city without a private league.

During World War I, the private schools felt the need of a league, and got together for a track and field meet in the spring of 1917. Prominent members were Polytechnic Prep (now Poly Prep), Horace Mann, Dwight, and Trinity). New York’s Catholic schools during much of the 1920s did not have much league sponsorship, and also participated in league events, notably DelaSalle, Bishop Loughlin, St. Augustine (defunct), and La Salle Military Academy (defunct); they now participate in the Catholic High School Athletic Association (CHSAA).

The league was reestablished in 1987 with 5 original schools: Our Savior Lutheran High School, Martin Luther High School, McBurney School, Pilgrim Christian, and Suffolk Lutheran High School.

List of schools
Abraham Joshua Heschel School
Avenues: The World School
Bay Ridge Preparatory School in Bay Ridge, Brooklyn
Calhoun School
Columbia Grammar and Preparatory School
Dalton School
Evangel Christian School in Long Island City, Queens
Friends Seminary
Grace Church School
Greater New York Academy
The Kew-Forest School
The Knox School in Saint James, New York
Lawrence-Woodmere Academy in Woodmere, New York
Lexington School and Center for the Deaf in Jackson Heights, New York
Long Island Lutheran Middle and High School in Brookville, New York
Marsha Stern Talmudical Academy
Martin de Porres High School
Martin Luther High School in Maspeth, Queens
Masters School
New York Institute for Special Education in Williamsbridge, Bronx
North Shore Hebrew Academy
Our Savior New American School
Portledge School in Locust Valley, New York
St. Ann's School
St. Demetrios School in Astoria, Queens
St. George Ukrainian Catholic School
Solomon Schechter in Glen Cove, New York
Staten Island Academy in Staten Island, New York
The Stony Brook School in Stony Brook, New York
United Nations International School
Waldorf School of Garden City
York Preparatory School

See also
The following independent school sport leagues are also in New York state:
NYSAIS - New York State Association of Independent Schools Athletic Association

External links
 www.psaany.org

High school sports conferences and leagues in the United States
High school sports associations in New York (state)
Sports in New York (state)